Giulio Negrone or Iulius Nigronius (1553-1625) was a Jesuit humanist orator and scholar, who also wrote under the name Panfilo Landi.

Biography 
Born in Genoa in 1553, he joined the Society of Jesus in 1571. As Rector of the Accademia Partenia of Rome, he wrote a treatise on the chain impresa of the Academy, emphasising its Neoplatonic and Christian connotations. He was a professor of rhetoric, philosophy and theology at Milan and Genoa. Among his pupils was the future Cardinal Odoardo Farnese. He undertook with Claudio Acquaviva's approbation a copious ascetical commentary on the Common Rules (Regulae Communes Societatis Iesu), published in Milan in 1613. A staunch Ciceronian, Negrone was the author of a number of rhetorical works. He died in Milan in 1625.

Works
 
 
 
 
 Tractatus ascetici, 1623.

References

1553 births
1625 deaths
Renaissance humanists
16th-century Italian Jesuits
Clergy from Geneva
17th-century Italian Jesuits